The Brussels tram route 55 is a tram route in Brussels, Belgium operated by the STIB/MIVB. The route connects the Bordet railway station in the municipality of Evere, northeast of Brussels, to the Rogier metro station in the City of Brussels. The route also crosses the municipalities of Saint-Josse and Schaerbeek. The route was cut in the years 2000s with the STIB/MIVB willing to reduce the number of tram routes riding in the north–south tunnel. Prior to this, the route went on up to the southern municipality of Uccle at the Silence stop. A part of this section is now served by Brussels tram route 51.

See also
List of Brussels tram routes

External links
 STIB/MIVB website

55
City of Brussels
Evere
Schaerbeek